Sherzhong Gewog (Dzongkha: གསེར་གཞོང་) is a gewog (village block) of Sarpang District, Bhutan. Serzhong Gewog, together with Bhur, Taklai, and Gelephu Gewogs, belongs to Gelephu Dungkhag.

References

Gewogs of Bhutan
Sarpang District